Jack Austin Watkins (October 27, 1923 – May 22, 1998) was an American professional basketball and minor league baseball player. He played in the National Basketball League for the Sheboygan Red Skins during the 1948–49 season and averaged 0.7 points per game. In baseball, he played during the 1948 season for the Montgomery Rebels in the Southeastern League.

Watkins served in the Marine Corps during World War II. Upon returning, he played baseball and basketball at the University of Oklahoma, where in 1946–47 he appeared in the 1947 NCAA basketball tournament as the Sooners advanced to the national championship game before losing to Holy Cross, 58–47.

References

1923 births
1998 deaths
United States Marine Corps personnel of World War II
American men's basketball players
Baseball players from Oklahoma
Basketball coaches from Oklahoma
Basketball players from Oklahoma
Guards (basketball)
High school basketball coaches in Oklahoma
Military personnel from Oklahoma
Montgomery Rebels players
Oklahoma Sooners baseball players
Oklahoma Sooners men's basketball players
People from Drumright, Oklahoma
Professional Basketball League of America players
Sheboygan Red Skins players